Westbrook is a rural town and locality in the Toowoomba Region, Queensland, Australia.

Geography
The Gore Highway passes through Westbrook. The Toowoomba Second Range Crossing passes through the western part of the locality with no intersections. The Toowoomba-Karara Road runs along the south-eastern boundary.

Westbrook has the following mountains:

 Bunkers Hill 
 Sugarloaf 
 Mt peel (27.6000° S, 151.9000° E) 697 metres

History

The name Westbrook comes from the name of the Westbrook pastoral run named by John 'Tinker' Campbell, a pastoralist and merchant, in 1841. 

In 1877,  of land was resumed from the Westbrook pastoral run to establish smaller farms. The land was offered for selection on 17 April 1877.

Bunker's Hill State School opened on 1 January 1899 under head teacher Walter Richmond.

Westbrook Reformatory School for Boys opened on 5 May 1900, having been relocated from Lytton Hill on the orders of Colonel George Arthur French, Commandant of the newly created Queensland Defence Force. On 30 October 1919, it was renamed Farm Home for Boys, Westbrook to have a "positive 'moral effect' on the boys". On 26 May 1966 it was renamed Westbrook Training Centre. Circa 1987, it was renamed Westbrook Youth Detention Centre. It closed on 30 June 1994. It was located at a site bounded by Westbrook Wyreema Road, Toowoomba Athol Road and Althus Road.

Westbrook Presbyterian Church was officially opened on Sunday 15 June 1902 by Reverend Robert Henry Roberts. Reverend Joseph Lundie and Messrs Munro and Robertson, all of Toowoomba, donated the  site, while Frederick George Gray Couper of Westbrook Station gifted the building, a former billiard room at the Westbrook Homestead. Prior to the opening of the church, Presbyterian worship had been held in the home of Mr and Mrs Hugh Campbell. On Saturday 14 June 1952, the church celebrated its golden jubilee with the laying of the foundation stone for a new church building by Ralph Havelock Couper, son of Frederick Couper who donated the original building. On Sunday 14 September 1952, the new church building was officially opened by the Reverend J. Fairlie Forrest with over 200 people attending. The new church cost only £900 due to the men of the congregation providing volunteer labour. The church was sold circa 1995 and has been converted into a house. It is at 1220 Gore Highway.

Westbrook Provisional School opened on 25 July 1887. In 1903, it was renamed Athol Provisional School and became Athol State School on  1 October 1910. It closed on 20 July 1962. It was located on the north-east corner of Athol School Road and Berghofer Road in neighbouring Athol.

Westbrook Crossing State School opened on 9 February 1910, but it was later renamedWestbrook State School. It was officially opened by James Tolmie and Thomas Robert Roberts, the two Members of the Queenland Legislative Assembly for Drayton and Toowoomba. The school closed on 6 July 1969. It was on the north-western corner of Barwick Street and Gore Street.

The architects were James Marks and Son of Toowoomba and it was built by H. Andrews. 

On 25 April (Anzac Day) 1922, the Westbrook War Memorial was unveiled by Littleton Groom, the then Attorney-General for Australia and Member for the Darling Downs. The memorial commemorates the service of 47 local men in World War I and is located at Main Street in front of the Westbrook Hall.

The town has grown to become a satellite suburb of Toowoomba and is now one of the fastest growing areas of the city, and is home to many of its workers.

Heritage listings
Westbrook has a number of heritage-listed sites, including:
 Coupers Road: Westbrook Homestead
 114 Toowoomba Road: Westbrook War Memorial

Education

Bunker's Hill State School is a government primary (Prep-6) school for boys and girls at 315 Bunkers Hill School Road. In 2012, it had 205 students enrolled with 17 teachers (12.6 full-time equivalent). In 2018, the school had an enrolment of 253 students with19 teachers (16 full-time equivalent) and 14 non-teaching staff (8 full-time equivalent).

There are no secondary schools in Westbrook. The nearest government secondary school is Harristown State High School in Harristown to the north-east.

Amenities
Library services in Westbrook are provided by the Toowoomba Regional Council's mobile library service. The van visits Main Street every Saturday.

There are a number of parks in the area:

 Carla Cresent Park
 Centenary Park

 Ferguson Road Park

 Michael Street Park

 Westbrook Park

References

Further reading

  — includes Athol State School (1887-1962), Westbrook State School (1910-1969), Couper Memorial School (1946-1948), and Westbrook Training Centre (1900-1994)

External links

 
 

Towns in Queensland
Toowoomba Region
Localities in Queensland